The 2008 New York Dragons season is the 14th season for the franchise, their eighth season in New York. The Dragons finished the regular season with an 8–8 record, and were able to take the 6th and final playoff seed in the National Conference by virtue of winning a tiebreaker scenario over the New Orleans VooDoo. The Dragons won their Wild Card round game, upsetting the Dallas Desperados 77–63. The Desperados had defeated the Dragons in both regular season meetings. In the Divisional round of the playoffs, the Dragons lost to top seeded Philadelphia Soul, 48–49, who the Dragons had also lost both regular season meetings to.

Standings

Regular season schedule

Playoff schedule

Coaching

Roster

Stats

Regular season

Week 1: at Cleveland Gladiators

Week 2: vs. Kansas City Brigade

Week 3: at Philadelphia Soul

Week 4: at Arizona Rattlers

Week 5: vs. Dallas Desperados

Week 6: vs. Grand Rapids Rampage

 Rookie Defensive Speacilist John Walker was Named Defensive Player of the Week

Week 7: vs. Columbus Destroyers

Week 8: at Tampa Bay Storm

Week 9: vs. Cleveland Gladiators

Week 10
Bye Week

Week 11: vs. Los Angeles Avengers

Week 12: vs. Georgia Force

Week 13: at Columbus Destroyers

Week 14: at Colorado Crush

Week 15: vs. New Orleans VooDoo

Week 16: at Dallas Desperados

Week 17: vs. Philadelphia Soul

Playoffs

National Conference Wild Card: at (3) Dallas Desperados

National Conference Divisional: at (1) Philadelphia Soul

References

New York Dragons
New York Dragons seasons